Symphoricarpos guadalupensis, McKittrock's snowberry, is a rare North American species of plants in the honeysuckle family. It has been found only in South McKittrick Canyon in the Guadalupe Mountains of western Texas. This is inside Guadalupe Mountains National Park.

Symphoricarpos guadalupensis is a hairless shrub. This distinguishes it sharply from Symphoricarpos palmeri, which can be found growing in the same canyon as S. guadalupensis but is rather hairy.

References

External links

guadalupensis
Flora of Texas
Plants described in 1968
Guadalupe Mountains National Park